Elections to Liverpool City Council were held on 7 May 1953.

After the election, the composition of the council was:

Election result

Ward results

* - Councillor seeking re-election

(PARTY) - Party of former Councillor

This was the first election with new boundaries since the 1952 election.

Deleted ward names : Brunswick, Castle Street, Edge Hill, Exchange, Garston, Great George, Kirkdale, Little Woolton, Much Woolton, North Scotland, St. Anne's, St. Peter's, Sefton Park East, Sefton Park West, South Scotland, Walton, Wavertree, Wavertree West and West Derby.

New ward names : Arundel, Broadgreen, Central, Church, Clubmoor, County, Gillmoss, Melrose, Picton, Pirrie, St. James', St. Mary's,  St. Michael's, Smithdown, Speke, Tuebrook, Westminster and Woolton.

This was an 'all up' election were three councillors were elected for each ward. The term of office for the councillor with the largest number of votes in each ward was three years. The councillor with the second highest number of votes was elected for two years, and the councillor with the third highest number of votes in each ward was elected for one year.
Comparisons are made with the election results or the year when the sitting councillor was elected, although boundary changes make these comparisons of limited use.

Abercromby

Aigburth

Allerton

Anfield

Arundel

The successful candidates for Arundel were previously elected for the Sefton Park East wards under the previous ward boundaries in 1950, 1951 and 1952.

Breckfield

Broadgreen

Central

Childwall

Church

Clubmoor

County

Croxteth

Dingle

Dovecot

Everton

Fairfield

Fazakerley

Gillmoss

Granby

Kensington

Low Hill

Melrose

Netherfield

Old Swan

Picton

Pirrie

Prince's Park

Sandhills

St. Domingo

St. James

St. Mary's

St. Michael's

 

Comparisons with former Sefton Park West ward.

Smithdown

Comparisons with former Edge Hill ward.

Speke

Comparisons made with the former Garston ward.

Tuebrook

Vauxhall

Warbreck

Westminster

Woolton

By-elections

Abercromby, Wednesday 30 September 1953
Cllr. Thomas George Dominic Maguire (Abercromby, Labour) died on 24 August 1953

Vauxhall, Thursday 19 November 1953

Two vacancies in the Vauxhall ward were created by the death of Alderman Bertie Victor Kirby C.B.E. D.C.M. on 1 September 1953, Cllr. John Sheehan was elected as Alderman by the City Council on 7 October 1953 and assigned as Returning Officer for the Granby ward. and the resignation of Cllr. Edward Corrigan.

Allerton, Thursday 17 December 1953

A vacancy in the Allerton ward was created by the death of Cllr. Margaret Jane Strong (Conservative, Allerton) on 11 November 1953.

References

1953
1953 English local elections
1950s in Liverpool